Anne Eline Riisnæs (born 15 April 1951) is a Norwegian pianist and piano pedagog.

Early life 
Riisnæs was born in Oslo. Her mother was Eline Nygaard Riisnæs, a pianist.
Riisnæs's sisters were Knut Riisnæs (1945–), a jazz saxophonist, and Odd Riisnæs (1953–).

Career 
Riisnæs debuted 1977 in Oslo, and the following year she received her diploma at Norges Musikkhøgskole. Later she studied in Wien, Austria and has held many concerts both in Norway and internationally as a soloist and accompanist. She has been a soloist with both Oslo-Filharmonien and Bergen Filharmoniske Orkester, and the symphony orchestras of Economics and Stavanger. Besides a number of recordings in NRK, she has done several school concert tours for Rikskonsertene. In recent years she has been involved in performance practice, and also plays the fortepiano. She has received a number of public and private grants.

Riisnæs is employed at the Department of Musicology, University of Oslo, and at the Norges Musikkhøgskole, and debuted on record with Return where she played Sonata Hob. XVI/52, L. 62 in E flat major by Joseph Haydn, Fantasies op. 116 by Johannes Brahms, Sonata op. 1 by Alban Berg and Preludes by George Gershwin.

Discography 
2011: Return (OffTheRecords), med Sonate Hob. XVI/52, L. 62 i Ess-dur av Joseph Haydn, Fantasier op. 116 av Johannes Brahms, Sonate op. 1 av Alban Berg og Preludier av George Gershwin
2010: Oboe Sonatas, med Brynjar Hoff

References

External links 
Anne Eline Riisnæs Biography on Store Norske Leksikon

1951 births
Musicians from Oslo
Academic staff of the University of Oslo
Norwegian women pianists
Norwegian musicologists
Women musicologists
Norwegian women academics
Living people
21st-century pianists
Women classical pianists
21st-century women pianists